Sekolah Jenis Kebangsaan Damansara or SJKC Damansara (白沙罗华小) is a primary school in Damansara, Petaling Jaya, Selangor, Malaysia.

History
The school was founded in 1930.  It was the first national primary school in Section 17, Petaling Jaya, and one of the oldest in Malaysia.  Previously, the old SJKC Damansara had one block located at Section 17 near Jalan Damansara (now Sprint Expressway). However, on 26 January 2001, the school was moved from the old block at Section 17 to the new school at PJU 3, near Tropicana Golf and Country Resort following instructions from the Federal Government of Malaysia that it no longer provided a "conducive learning environment" because of traffic congestion and noise pollution from the neighbouring Sprint Expressway. The school is now celebrating its 90th anniversary.

Present
The school's medium of instruction is Bahasa Malaysia, English and Chinese being taught in the primary school.

References

Petaling Jaya
Primary schools in Malaysia